WHBL (1330 AM) is a radio station in Sheboygan, Wisconsin with a Conservative talk radio format. The station is owned by Wausau-based Midwest Communications, along with three sister FM stations in the market.

WHBL's programming is also carried on an FM translator station in the immediate Sheboygan area, W268BR, 101.5 FM, which like WHBL transmits from the Midwest tower site on Sheboygan's south side. W268BR launched operations on April 16, 2016.

Programming

The station's programming is standard for an AM talk station, and organized, including imaging, in the same manner as Green Bay sister station WTAQ. It features a local morning show, Sheboygan's Morning News with Kelly Meyer, along with daily Focus on the Family commentary, "Regular Joe" Giganti from WTAQ, and national conservative talk programs the rest of the day, including Dan Bongino, Sean Hannity, Mark Levin and Buck Sexton. The Clark Howard Show is at the end of the evening (along with a 'best-of' show on Sunday afternoons), followed by Coast to Coast AM nightly. The station also maintains local rights to the Glenn Beck Program, but only carries a weekend 'best-of' compilation of the daily series.

The station's weather forecasts are provided by WLUK-TV in Green Bay, a deal that was retained despite WLUK losing cable carriage in Sheboygan in 2011 due to outside corporate factors involving Fox programming.

Weekends consist mainly of general advice shows, including Kim Komando, Handel on the Law, Legal Defense with local attorney Kirk Obear via a brokered programming arrangement, the weekend best-of package of The Rush Limbaugh Show, and Leo Laporte's The Tech Guy, along with sports programs such as Pro Football Weekly and the regional outdoors show Outdoors Radio with Dan Small. Local church programming and The Lutheran Hour airs on Sunday morning, along with the polka-focused Polkatime America.

The station also carries Milwaukee Brewers baseball, Green Bay Packers football, Wisconsin Badgers football and men's basketball, and local high school sports. All programming on weekdays and weekends is subject to sports or breaking news pre-emption.

History

 
WHBL was first licensed on March 5, 1925 to seventeen-year-old James H. Slusser in Logansport, Indiana. WHBL was an upgrade to Slusser's amateur radio station, 9EM, and he paid for the equipment with earnings from delivering newspapers. The call letters were randomly assigned  from a sequential roster of available call signs, and Slusser adopted "We Heartily Boost Logansport" as the station's slogan.

The station was soon configured as a portable broadcasting station. Portable stations could be transported from place-to-place on movable platforms such as trucks. They were commonly hired out for a few weeks at a time to theaters located in small towns that didn't have their own radio stations, to be used for special programs broadcast to the local community. (Regulating "moving targets" proved difficult, so in May 1928 the Federal Radio Commission announced it was ending the licensing of portable facilities.) In early 1926 ownership was transferred to C. L. Carrell of Chicago, Illinois, joining a roster of what would ultimately become seven portable stations operated by Carrell.

In early 1928 the Sheboygan Press made arrangements to have WHBL permanently moved to Sheboygan.  WHBL was the third Carrell station sponsored by the Press to broadcast in Sheboygan. In April 1926, the newspaper arranged for station WIBJ to operate from the Van Der Vaart theater for a two week run, from the 5th until the 17th. Eighteen months later, in October 1927, the Press arranged for a second Carrell station, WHBM, to broadcast from the Eagles auditorium beginning on October 24, as part of the newspaper's "Radio Show and Home Exposition". This apparently was planned to be a more permanent endeavor, and WHBM continued to operate under the auspices of the newspaper following the close of the exposition. However, an unresolved financial dispute with the local musicians union resulted in the station being withdrawn at the end of the year.

Two months later, after reaching a settlement with the musicians, the Press brought in WHBL to restart operations. The debut broadcast took place at 7:30 p.m. on February 23, 1928, and editor Charles E. Broughton's opening statement summarized the events of the preceding months:

WHBL was now jointly owned by the Press Publishing Co. and C. L. Carrell. Two years later the publishing company assumed full ownership.

Jerry Bader controversy (2018)
Talk show host Jerry Bader was let go from Midwest Communications after his February 8, 2018 program, and he claimed his "never Trump" political stance had caused friction with station management, which ended his run on WHBL. WTAQ's John Muir was named the new mid-morning host by April 2018.

Bader had been with WHBL in some form since the 1980s, at first as the station's news director through the 1980s and most of the '90s (outside of a year with WCNZ) until the 2000 purchase of WHBL by Midwest. Under new management, WHBL went from a full-service format to matching that of WTAQ, and Bader was groomed into a political talk show host. WHBL continued to carry the WTAQ version of the show live after he moved there in 2004, along with WSAU in Wausau, and Bader also had the title of program director for WTAQ.

References

External links
WHBL official website

FCC History Cards for WHBL (covering 1927—1980)

HBL
News and talk radio stations in the United States
Radio stations established in 1925
1928 establishments in Wisconsin
Midwest Communications radio stations